Palle Frey (born 30 October 1920, date of death unknown) was a Danish sabre fencer. He competed at the 1952 and 1960 Summer Olympics.

References

1920 births
Year of death missing
Danish male sabre fencers
Olympic fencers of Denmark
Fencers at the 1952 Summer Olympics
Fencers at the 1960 Summer Olympics
Sportspeople from Copenhagen